The Health informatics - Electronic Health Record Communication (EN 13606) was the European Standard for an information architecture to communicate Electronic Health Records (EHR) of a patient. The standard was later adopted as ISO 13606 and later replaced with ISO 13606-2 and recently ISO 13606-5:2010. 

This standard was intended to support the interoperability of systems and components that need to communicate (access, transfer, add or modify) EHR data via electronic messages or as distributed objects:
 preserving the original clinical meaning intended by the author;
 reflecting the confidentiality of that data as intended by the author and patient.

References

External links
 EN13606 community and information site
 Published Archetypes by Minas Gerais, Brazil (Portuguese)
 Poseacle Converter and Repository

See also
 Archetype (information science)
 Clinical Document Architecture (CDA)
 Clinical Data Interchange Standards Consortium (CDISC)
 Continuity of Care Record
 Electronic health record (EHR)
 European Institute for Health Records
 Health Informatics Service Architecture (HISA)
 Health Level 7
 HIPAA
 HISA
 OpenEHR
 ProRec
 SNOMED CT
 LOINC
 RxNorm
 UCUM

Standards for electronic health records
International standards